"Living in a Dream" is a song by Australian pop group Pseudo Echo. The song was released in April 1986 as the third single from their second studio album, Love an Adventure (1985). The song peaked at number 15 on the Australian Kent Music Report and number 57 on the American Billboard Hot 100 in 1987.

Formats and track listings 
7" (EMI-1729) 
Side A "Living in a Dream" – 3:24
Side B "Loose Ends" – 2:28

12" (EMI – ED 190)
Side A "Living in a Dream" (Metal Mix) – 5:39
Side B "Living in a Dream" – 3:24
Side B "Loose Ends" – 2:28

US 7" (RCA 5125-7-R)
Side A "Living in a Dream" – 3:24
Side B "Don't Go" – 3:54

European Maxi Single (RCA 49754)
 "Living in a Dream" (Oz Mix) – 5:39
 "Living in a Dream" – 3:25
 "Living in a Dream" (Dance Mix) – 5:20
 "Don't Go" – 3:54

Charts

References 

1985 songs
1986 singles
Pseudo Echo songs